Chaudhary Ram Lubaya (1914-2017) was a politician from Punjab, India.

Personal life 
Ram Lubhaya was born into Chamar family to Chaudhary Sunder Singh at Hoshiarpur, Punjab, British India. He was a graduate from Panjab University.

He was married to former Union Minister of state and M.P, Santosh Chowdhary.

Career 
In 2002, he became MLA from Sham Chaurasi constituency defeating Mohinder Kaur Josh.

Lubhaya died in 2017 due to heart attack in the All India Institute Of Medical Science, Delhi.

References 

1941 births
2017 deaths
People from Punjab, India
Panjab University alumni
Indian National Congress
Indian National Congress politicians from Punjab, India